Abeer Seikaly is a Jordanian-Canadian architect who designed a multi-use, disaster shelter for refugees. She lives in Amman Jordan. Seikaly is an architect and designer who has worked for Villa Moda in Kuwait in 2005. She directed the first contemporary art fair in Jordan in 2010.

Her style of work
Seikaly's ‘Weaving a Home’ uses fabric composed of high-strength plastic tubing molded into sine-waves that expand and enclose based on weather conditions; it is easily broken down to allow for mobility and transport. The tent also collects rainwater to be used for basic sanitation like showering, and absorb solar energy that is stored as electric energy in batteries.

Career
She is a member of RISE- Jordan's Women's Everest Expedition, that climbed Mount Everest in 2018.

Her works have been featured internationally, including at the MoMA in New York, the MAK in Vienna, and the Stedelijk Museum in Amsterdam.

Awards and honours
In 2013 she was awarded the Lexus Design Award.

See also
 Kamel Mahadin
 Ali Maher (artist/architect)

References 

Living people
Year of birth missing (living people)
Canadian architects
Jordanian architects